Max Flynn (born 1998) is an English badminton player and a national champion.

Career 
Flynn became an English National doubles champion after winning the English National Badminton Championships mixed doubles title with Fee Teng Liew in 2020.

Achievements

European Junior Championships 
Boys' doubles

BWF International Challenge/Series 
Men's doubles

Mixed doubles

  BWF International Challenge tournament
  BWF International Series tournament
  BWF Future Series tournament

References

External links 
 

1998 births
Living people
English male badminton players